"I Want You" is a song by Australian pop duo Savage Garden. It was originally released in Australia on 27 May 1996 as the lead single from their eponymous debut album, Savage Garden (1997). The single reached number one in Canada for two weeks and peaked at number four in Australia and on the US Billboard Hot 100. Much of the song's chart success in the US was the result of Rosie O'Donnell playing the song on several episodes of The Rosie O'Donnell Show. The single also peaked at number nine in Iceland and at 11 on the UK Singles Chart. In November 1998, the single was re-released in the United Kingdom following the success of "Truly Madly Deeply" and "To the Moon and Back". This release peaked at number 12.

At the APRA Music Awards of 1998 it won Most Performed Australian Work Overseas. In January 2018, as part of Triple M's "Ozzest 100", the 'most Australian' songs of all time, the album version of the song was ranked number 87.

In February 2023, Peking Duk released a version featuring re-recorded vocals by Darren Hayes.

Content
The song's lyrics refer to the attraction exerted by a person possessing strong sex appeal. They fascinate the singer and arouse his curiosity, even though he is not sure whether he needs them at all. Singer Darren Hayes described it as a song about "being in love with a male energy", when asked if the song had a coded gay message. The fast-paced, almost rapped vocal style verses is similar to the verses featured in Life Is a Rock (But the Radio Rolled Me) by Reunion.

In an interview with Apple Music about their debut album, Darren Hayes also said:

Critical reception
Larry Flick from Billboard noted that the song "has a jittery synth-pop beat reminiscent of such '80s-era Brit-pop heroes as Duran Duran." He added, "Partners Darren Hayes and Daniel Jones are quite the harmonious pair, and they are photogenic enough to ensure instant teen-idol status. Top 40 programmers should waste no time in slammin' this one on the air." British magazine Music Week rated it five out of five, describing it as "a great pop song akin to Roxette at their hook-happy best", and "a challenger for the UK number one spot."

Music videos
Two music videos were released for the song. Both videos present Darren Hayes with long black hair.

The first video is a low-budget version released in 1996 for Australian markets. It showed the band performing in a room full of disco lights and Darren Hayes singing on the back of a moving vehicle.

The second video was filmed on a high budget and premiered in 1997 for international markets in conjunction with the single's worldwide and American releases. Directed by Nigel Dick, it features the band in a stylised futuristic warehouse and recording studio. It was filmed on 11 February 1997 at the Harbor Generating Station in Long Beach, California. The international version was featured on the band's compilation Truly Madly Completely: The Best of Savage Garden (2005), while the Australian version was not available until the release of the compilation The Singles (2015).

In a 2022 interview with  News Corp, Darren Hayes said he only recently discovered the reason he was filmed in a metal head brace for the video was “because the lead singer looks gay when he moves.” Hayes added, “They were just going to tell me it was an ‘artistic decision’. I’m still fucking angry about that."

Track listings

Australia
 CD and cassette single
 "I Want You" – 3:53
 "Fire Inside the Man" – 4:11

 Remixes CD single
 "I Want You" (original radio version) – 3:54
 "I Want You" (Flu club mix) – 6:22
 "I Want You" (Pee Wee club mix) – 6:30
 "I Want You" (Flu radio edit) – 3:44
 "I Want You" (Flu Midnight Mix) – 6:24

United Kingdom
 CD single (1997)
 "I Want You" (album version)
 "I Want You" (Xenomania Funky Mix)
 "I Want You" (Xenomania 12-inch club mix)
 "I Want You" (Sharp Miami Mix)

 12-inch single (1997)
A1. "I Want You" (Xenomania Funky Mix)
A2. "I Want You" (Xenomania 12-inch club mix)
B1. "I Want You" (Sharp Miami Mix)
B2. "I Want You" (album version)

 Cassette single (1997)
 "I Want You" (album version)
 "Promises"

 CD1 (1998)
 "I Want You '98" (Bascombe Mix)
 "I Want You '98" (Sash! radio edit)
 "To the Moon and Back" (karaoke version)

 CD2 (1998)
 "I Want You '98" (Sash! extended mix)
 "I Want You" (Sharp Miami Mix)
 "I Want You" (Xenomania Funky Mix)

 Cassette single (1998)
 "I Want You '98" (Bascombe Mix)
 "I Want You '98" (Sash! radio edit)

Europe
 CD1
 "I Want You" (radio version) – 3:37
 "I Want You" (hot radio mix) – 3:33

 CD2
 "I Want You" (radio version) – 3:37
 "I Want You" (Pee Wee Club Mix) – 6:28
 "Tears of Pearls" – 3:47
 "Mine (And You Could Be)" – 4:29

United States
 CD and cassette single
 "I Want You" – 3:52
 "Tears of Pearls" – 3:47

 Maxi-CD single
 "I Want You" (album version) – 3:52
 "I Want You" (Jason Nevins' radio remix) – 3:37
 "I Want You" (Bastone club mix) – 8:30
 "I Want You" (I Need I Want Mix) – 7:55
 "I Want You" (hot radio mix) – 3:33

 12-inch single
A1. "I Want You" (Jason Nevins' radio remix) – 3:37
A2. "I Want You" (album version) – 3:52
B1. "I Want You" (Bastone club mix) – 8:30
B2. "I Want You" (I Need I Want Mix) – 7:55

Japan
 CD single
 "I Want You" (album version) – 3:53
 "I Want You" (Jason Nevins' radio remix) – 3:38
 "I Want You" (Bastone club mix) – 8:31
 "I Want You" (I Need I Want Mix) – 7:56
 "I Want You" (hot radio mix) – 3:34

Credits and personnel
Credits are adapted from the Savage Garden album booklet.

Studios
 Mixed at Gotham Studios (Melbourne, Australia)
 Mastered at Sony Music Studios (New York City)

Personnel

 Darren Hayes – writing, lead vocals, background vocals, vocal arrangement
 Daniel Jones – writing, additional vocals, additional guitars, keyboards, sequencing
 Rex Goh – guitar
 Alex Hewitson – bass
 Terepai Richmond – drums, percussion
 Charles Fisher – production, vocal arrangement
 Jim Bonnefond – vocal arrangement
 Chris Lord-Alge – mixing
 Vlado Meller – mastering

Charts

Weekly charts
"I Want You"

"I Want You '98"

Year-end charts

Decade-end charts

Certifications and sales

Release history

In popular culture

The song was used in Australian TV series Heartbreak High, during a dance sequence in an episode in which Katerina Ioannou (Ada Nicodemou) falls for her married dance partner.

The song is also used as the ending theme of the anime adaptation of JoJo's Bizarre Adventure, during its Diamond Is Unbreakable arc.

This song would later be featured on The CW drama series, Supernatural, during the opening scene of their thirteenth episode of their final season, "Destiny's Child" when an alternate universe version of protagonists Sam and Dean Winchester unexpectedly arrive.

The song is played at the school dance in Dawson's Creek in the second episode of Season One.

References

1996 songs
1996 debut singles
2023 singles
Savage Garden songs
APRA Award winners
Australian synth-pop songs
Columbia Records singles
JoJo's Bizarre Adventure songs
Music videos directed by Nigel Dick
Patter songs
RPM Top Singles number-one singles
Songs written by Daniel Jones (musician)
Songs written by Darren Hayes
Peking Duk songs
Darren Hayes songs